A cornetto, meaning "little horn", is an Italian variation of the Kipferl.

The main ingredients of a cornetto are pastry dough, eggs, butter, water and sugar. Egg yolk is brushed on the surface of the cornetto to obtain a golden color during baking.

The cornetto vuoto ("empty cornetto") is commonly accompanied by various fillings, including crema pasticcera (custard), apricot jam or chocolate cream, and covered with powdered sugar or ground nuts. A cornetto with an espresso or cappuccino at a coffee bar is considered to be the most common breakfast in Italy.

The name cornetto is common in Southern and Central Italy, while it is called brioche in the North.

History
The recipe of Kipferl became popular in Italy, and more specifically in Veneto, after 1683, thanks to the intense commercial relations between the Republic of Venice and Vienna.   In France, it was not until the 1770  marriage between the Austrian Marie-Antoinette and the future King Louis XVI that the pastry gained popularity there. Its recipe was modified by the pastry chefs, who enriched it with butter and called it a croissant. The first recipe of yeast-leavened laminated croissant is from the French chef Sylvain Claudius Goy. The croissant became popular in France mainly in the 20th century.

See also
 Croissant
 Sfogliatella
 List of pastries

References

Italian pastries
Italian desserts
Italian words and phrases